Georgia Buchanan (born 23 December 1990), known professionally as Call Me Loop, is an English singer and songwriter. Following the release of her debut single "Looking at You" in 2016, she has since independently released two extended plays, Call Me Loop (2017) and Drama (2019).

Early life
Call Me Loop was born as Georgia Buchanan on 23 December 1990. She began writing songs and performing at the age of five, and participated in talent shows at school and summer camp. For her fourteenth birthday, her parents paid for the opportunity to record her first song in a professional recording studio. After attending Guildford High School, from which she graduated from in 2009. she studied drama at the University of Exeter. After her graduation, she relocated from Surrey to South London in order to pursue a career in music.

Career
Originally known by the name Loop, Buchanan rebranded herself as Call Me Loop. In April 2016, Call Me Loop independently released her debut single, "Thinking of You". This was followed by various single releases including "Losing My Mind", "As If" and "Know Me Better". "As If" received attention from the public when Elton John selected the song to play on his Beats 1 radio show. In May 2017, she supported English DJ Jonas Blue on his European tour. Later that month, she released a self-titled extended play, which was acclaimed by critics. Later that year, she released "Maybe I'm a Liar", which Popjustice described as a "sprightly, R&B‑infused tropical slinker". 

Following the release of more singles including "Give 'n' Take", "Love the Lie", "Business" and "Silly Boy", Call Me Loop released her second extended play, Drama. Georgia Maher of The Line of Best Fit described Drama as a "solid collection of vibrant, infectious pop wonders", and titled her a "rising pop maverick", complimenting her songwriting ability. In 2020, "React", a song she co-wrote, was released by The Pussycat Dolls. She expressed her excitement at writing for them, commenting: "To have written it for an iconic girl band that I grew up listening to is just mind-blowing." This was followed by the release of her next singles, "Downhill From Here" and "Strike". She returned in 2022 with the singles "Year of the Ex" and "Painkiller".

Discography

Extended plays

Singles

Songwriting credits

References

External links
 

1990 births
21st-century English women singers
21st-century English singers
English women pop singers
Living people
Feminist musicians
Musicians from Surrey
People from Guildford
People educated at Guildford High School